The 2019 Newcastle Knights season was the 32nd in the club's history. Coached by Nathan Brown, interim coached by Kristian Woolf after Brown's contract was terminated, and captained by Mitchell Pearce, they competed in the NRL's 2019 Telstra Premiership, finishing the regular season in 11th place (out of 16).

Milestones
 Round 1: James Gavet made his debut for the club, after previously playing for the New Zealand Warriors.
 Round 1: Tim Glasby made his debut for the club, after previously playing for the Melbourne Storm and scored his 1st try for the club.
 Round 1: Hymel Hunt made his debut for the club, after previously playing for the South Sydney Rabbitohs.
 Round 1: David Klemmer made his debut for the club, after previously playing for the Canterbury-Bankstown Bulldogs.
 Round 1: Edrick Lee made his debut for the club, after previously playing for the Cronulla-Sutherland Sharks and scored his 1st try for the club.
 Round 1: Kurt Mann made his debut for the club, after previously playing for the St. George Illawarra Dragons.
 Round 1: Jesse Ramien made his debut for the club, after previously playing for the Cronulla-Sutherland Sharks.
 Round 3: Hymel Hunt played his 50th career game.
 Round 3: Jesse Ramien scored his 1st try for the club.
 Round 4: Hymel Hunt scored his 1st try for the club.
 Round 4: Edrick Lee scored his 50th career try.
 Round 4: Mason Lino made his debut for the club, after previously playing for the New Zealand Warriors.
 Round 6: Mitchell Barnett kicked his 1st career goal.
 Round 7: James Gavet scored his 1st try for the club.
 Round 9: Lachlan Fitzgibbon played his 50th career game.
 Round 9: Edrick Lee played his 100th career game.
 Round 10: Nathan Brown won his 100th career game as coach.
 Round 10: Kurt Mann scored his 1st try for the club.
 Round 13: Mason Lino kicked his 1st goal for the club.
 Round 13: Sione Mata'utia played his 100th career game.
 Round 15: Mason Lino scored his 1st try for the club.
 Round 16: Phoenix Crossland made his NRL debut for the club.
 Round 16: Shaun Kenny-Dowall captained his 1st game for the club.
 Round 16: Kurt Mann played his 100th career game.
 Round 21: Shaun Kenny-Dowall played his 50th game for the club.
 Round 21: Jacob Saifiti played his 50th career game.
 Round 22: Josh King played his 50th career game.
 Round 23: Bradman Best made his NRL debut for the club.
 Round 24: Bradman Best scored his 1st career try.
 Round 25: Starford To'a made his NRL debut for the club and scored his 1st career try.

Squad

Transfers and Re-signings

Gains

Losses

Promoted juniors

Change of role

Re-signings

Player contract situations

Ladder

Jerseys and sponsors
In 2019, the Knights' jerseys were made by ISC and their major sponsor is nib Health Funds.

Fixtures

Pre-season trials

Regular season

Statistics

27 players used.

Source:

Representative honours

The following players appeared in a representative match in 2019.

Australia
David Klemmer

Australian Men's Nines
Kalyn Ponga

Australian Schoolboys
Mitchell Black
Cooper Jenkins

Indigenous All Stars
Jesse Ramien

Junior Kangaroos
Kalyn Ponga

Junior Kiwis
Christian Ma'anaima
Simi Sasagi (squad member)
Daniel Ticehurst
Starford To'a

Māori All Stars
Danny Levi
Kalyn Ponga

New South Wales
David Klemmer
Mitchell Pearce
Daniel Saifiti

New South Wales under-16s
Max Bradbury
Lachlan Crouch
Oryn Keeley
Fletcher Myers
Noah Nailagoliva
Jonah Pezet
Noah Reed

New South Wales under-18s
Bradman Best
Mitchell Black

New South Wales under-20s
Mat Croker
Phoenix Crossland (20th man)
Tex Hoy
Luke Huth

New Zealand Nines
Starford To'a (squad member)

Queensland
Tim Glasby
Kalyn Ponga

Queensland under-20s
Brandon Russell (squad member)

Samoa
Herman Ese'ese
James Gavet
Hymel Hunt
Mason Lino

Samoan Nines
James Gavet (squad member)
Danny Levi

Tonga
Kristian Woolf (coach)

References

Newcastle Knights seasons
Newcastle Knights season